Lionel Emmitt (birth registered second ¼ 1930) is a Welsh former professional rugby league footballer who played in the 1950s.

Background
Lionel Emmitt's birth was registered in Bridgend district, Wales.

International honours
Lionel Emmitt won a cap for Wales while at Blackpool Borough in 1959 against France.

Note
Lionel Emmitt's surname is variously spelt correctly as Emmitt, and incorrectly as Emmett.

References

1930 births
Living people
Blackpool Borough players
Leigh Leopards players
Oldham R.L.F.C. players
Rugby league players from Bridgend County Borough
Rugby league wingers
Wales national rugby league team players
Welsh rugby league players